Stephan Abel Sinding (4 August 1846 – 23 January 1922) was a Norwegian-Danish sculptor. He moved to Copenhagen in 1883 and had his breakthrough the same year. In 1890 he obtained Danish citizenship. In 1910 he settled in Paris where he lived and worked until his death in 1922.

Early life and education

Stephan Abel Sinding was born in Trondhjem as a son of mining engineer  Matthias Wilhelm Sinding (1811–1860) and Cecilie Marie Mejdell (1817–1886). Sinding was the brother of the composer Christian Sinding and painter Otto Ludvig Sinding and the nephew of Nicolai Mejdell (1822–1899) and Thorvald Mejdell (1824–1908), and through the former a first cousin of Glør Thorvald Mejdell, who married Stephan's sister Thora Cathrine Sinding. Stephan Sinding was also a first cousin of Alfred Sinding-Larsen and the three siblings Ernst Anton Henrik Sinding, Elisabeth Sinding (1846–1930) and Gustav Adolf Sinding      (1849–1925).

Sinding first embarked on law studies in Christiania but broke off to instead pursue a career in the arts. He took drawing and modeling classes first at the Royal School of Drawing in Christiania and then studied privately with sculptor Albert Wolff in Berlin. Sinding spent his adult life working in different places mostly Rome, Copenhagen, and finally Paris. 

From 1874 to 1875 he  studied in Paris and picked up influences from the latest Realist tendencies in French sculptures, especially from Auguste Rodin and Paul Dubois.  Sinding was met with poor recognition from the Norwegian public since his style was considered too modern.

Career in Denmark

In 1883 he moved to Copenhagen, which he found a better working place, and had his breakthrough with the sculpture A barbarian woman carries her dead son home from the battle, created during a stay in Rome that same year. It was acquired by the brewer Carl Jacobsen, the son and heir of Carlsberg-founder Jacob Christian Jacobsen, who was a great admirer of both classical and modern sculpture and was building an ever-growing private collection which in the end turned into the Ny Carlsberg Glyptotek

Sinding created a number of sculptures, among others Mother in Captivity, which won him the Grand Prix at the Exposition Universelle (1889),  Two figures (1889), and Young woman at her husband's body / The Widow (1892). Many of Sinding's sculptures are credited to realism, but together with Danish sculptor Niels Hansen Jacobsen, among others, are by many considered much more in the style of Symbolism. An example of his symbolic work is his sculpture Valkyrjen (the valkyrie), a bronze cast of which stands in Churchill Park in Copenhagen.

Sinding became a titular professor and taught private students in Copenhagen.

Late years in Paris
In 1910 Sinding moved to Paris, where he worked until his death. Assisted by Franz von Jessen, Sinding wrote an autobiography entitled En Billedhuggers Liv (1921). He died in January 1922 in Paris, and was buried at the Père Lachaise Cemetery.

Private life
In May 1885 in Frederiksberg he married actress Anna Elga Augusta Betzonich (1859–1936).

Selected works
Vølund smed, 1873 
Hylas, ca. 1880
Slaven, 1878,
Frise, 1891 
Enken, 1892 
Henrik Ibsen, 1899
Bjørnstjerne Bjørnson, 1899
Moder Jord, 1900 
Ole Bull, 1901
Valkyrjen, 1908 
Angelus, 1913 
L'Offrande, 1918

References

Other sources
 Grappe,  Georges Stephan Sinding (Paris: Librairie Artistique Internationale. 1920)
Rapsilber, M.   Stephen Sinding (Marquardt & Co. 1910)

External links
 PortraitKatalog, (In German)

Danish sculptors
Danish male artists
Norwegian sculptors
Burials at Père Lachaise Cemetery
Artists from Copenhagen
19th-century sculptors
20th-century sculptors
19th-century Danish people
20th-century Danish people
Norwegian emigrants to Denmark
Naturalised citizens of Denmark
Danish expatriates in France
1846 births
1922 deaths
Male sculptors